Benjamin Irving Taylor (December 21, 1877 – September 5, 1946) was an American lawyer and politician who served one term as a U.S. Representative from New York from 1913 to 1915.

Biography 
Born in New York City, Taylor attended public schools and graduated from high school in New Rochelle, New York. He earned a degree from Columbia Law School in New York City in 1899. He was admitted to the bar the same year and commenced practice in Port Chester, New York.

Political career 
Taylor served as supervisor of Harrison, New York, from 1905 to 1913. He was elected as a Democrat to the Sixty-third Congress (March 4, 1913 – March 3, 1915). He was an unsuccessful candidate for reelection in 1914 to the Sixty-fourth Congress.

Later career and death
After leaving Congress, he resumed the practice of law in Port Chester, New York.

Taylor was again elected supervisor of Harrison in 1921, and served in that capacity, with the exception of two years, until December 1945.

He died in Harrison, New York, September 5, 1946, and was interred in Kensico Cemetery, Valhalla, New York.

Sources

1877 births
1946 deaths
Columbia Law School alumni
New York (state) lawyers
Politicians from New Rochelle, New York
Town supervisors in New York (state)
Politicians from Westchester County, New York
People from Harrison, New York
Burials at Kensico Cemetery
Democratic Party members of the United States House of Representatives from New York (state)
Lawyers from New Rochelle, New York